Cipollina is Italian for chives.

Cipollina may also refer to:

People
 Adriano Cipollina, Belgian soccer player who entered free agency in 2018; see List of Belgian football transfers summer 2018
 Amara Cipollina, French gymnast and bronze medallist at the 2014 18th Tournoi International
 Jean Cipollina (1903–1981), Italian Olympic rower
 John Cipollina (1943–1989), U.S. guitarist
 Mario Cipollina, U.S. guitarist

Places
 Cipollina, subdivision of Ronco Scrivia, Genoa, Liguria, Italy
 Cascina Cipollina, subdivision of Carbonate, Lombardy, Italy

See also

 
 Cipollone
 Cipollini (disambiguation)
 Cipollino (disambiguation)
 Chipolin (disambiguation)
 Cipolla (disambiguation)